Pale Rider is a 1985 American Western film produced and directed by Clint Eastwood, who also stars in the lead role. The title is a reference to the Four Horsemen of the Apocalypse, as the pale horse's ghost rider (Eastwood) represents Death. The film, which took in over $41 million at the box office, became the highest-grossing Western of the 1980s.

Plot
In the Old West, outside LaHood, California in Carbon Valley, mining baron Coy LaHood is waging a war of intimidation against independent prospectors and their families, including Hull Barret who is courting Sarah Wheeler. Sarah's teenaged daughter, Megan, prays for deliverance from LaHood after a gang of his men attack the mining camp and kill her dog. Shortly afterward, a man atop a pale horse rides into Carbon Valley. When Hull heads to town to pick up supplies, four of Lahood's men beat him with axe handles before the stranger fights them off with his own axe handle. Hull then invites his rescuer to dinner and, while the stranger is washing, notices what appears to be six bullet wounds in his back. When the stranger arrives at the dining table, he is wearing a clerical collar and is thereafter referred to as "Preacher". Coy LaHood's son, Joshua, attempts to scare off the Preacher with a gigantic workman named Club. Preacher, however, disables Club with a sledgehammer blow to the groin.

Coy returns from Sacramento, learns of the Preacher's arrival, and unsuccessfully attempts to bribe and then threaten him. At Preacher's suggestion, LaHood then offers the miners $1,000 per claim provided they evacuate within 24 hours. LaHood says he plans to hire the services of a corrupt marshal named Stockburn to clear them out if they refuse. The miners ultimately reject LaHood's offer, despite Preacher warning them about Stockburn. Megan expresses her love for Preacher, but he gently rebuffs her. Megan angrily assumes Preacher is really in love with Sarah. LaHood's men dam the creek forcing the miners to mine a dry bed. Megan rides into LaHood's camp, where Joshua shows her the blasting operation before he attempts to rape her. Preacher arrives on horseback, disarms Joshua and shoots him through the hand.

Stockburn and his deputies arrive in LaHood. Coy gives him a rough description of the Preacher, which startles Stockburn, because the man Coy is describing is dead. Spider Conway, one of the miners and Coy's former partner, discovers a large gold nugget in the dry creek bed and rides into town with his teenage sons, where he yells drunken abuse at LaHood from the street. Stockburn and his deputies gun him down, and Stockburn sends a message that he wants Preacher to meet him in town the next morning. Sarah begs Preacher not to go, and tells him she will marry Hull, despite her feelings for Preacher.

The following day, Preacher and Hull blow up LaHood's mining site with dynamite. To stop Hull from following him, Preacher scares off Hull's horse and rides into town alone. In the gunfight that follows, he kills all but the two of LaHood's men who run away, and then, one by one, all six of Stockburn's deputies. Finally, Preacher kills Stockburn who recognizes him in disbelief before he is shot in the head. LaHood, watching from his office, aims a rifle at the Preacher but is shot dead by Hull.

Preacher nods at Hull and rides off toward the snow-capped mountains. Megan arrives and, seeing Preacher riding away, shouts her love and thanks to him.

Cast

 Clint Eastwood as The Preacher
 Michael Moriarty as Hull Barret
 Carrie Snodgress as Sarah Wheeler
 Richard Dysart as Coy LaHood
 Chris Penn as Josh LaHood
 Sydney Penny as Megan Wheeler
 John Russell as Marshal Stockburn
 Richard Kiel as "Club"
 Doug McGrath as "Spider" Conway
 Chuck Lafont as Eddie Conway
 Billy Drago as Deputy Mather
 Jeffrey Weissman as Teddy Conway
 Charles Hallahan as McGill
 Marvin J. McIntyre as Jagou
 Fran Ryan as Ma Blankenship
 Richard Hamilton as Pa Blankenship
 Terrence Evans as Jake Henderson

Production
Pale Rider was primarily filmed in the Boulder Mountains and the Sawtooth National Recreation Area in central Idaho, just north of Sun Valley in late 1984. The opening credits scene featured the jagged Sawtooth Mountains south of Stanley. Train-station scenes were filmed in Tuolumne County, California, near Jamestown.

Scenes of a more established Gold Rush town (in which Eastwood's character picks up his pistol at a Wells Fargo office) were filmed in the real Gold Rush town of Columbia, also in Tuolumne County.

Crew
 Clint Eastwood: Producer/director/star
 Lennie Niehaus: Composer
 Bruce Surtees: Director of photography
 Joel Cox: Film editing
 Edward Carfagno: Production design
 Chuck Gaspar: Special effects
 Buddy Van Horn: Stunt coordinator
 Jack N. Green: Camera operator
 Marcia Reed: Still photographer
 Deborah Hopper: Costume designer/wardrobe: women

Religious themes
In an audio interview, Clint Eastwood said that his character Preacher "is an out-and-out ghost." However, whereas Eastwood's 1973 western, High Plains Drifter, resolves its storyline by means of a series of unfolding flashback narratives (although ambiguity still remains), Pale Rider does not include any such obvious clues to the nature and past of Preacher other than six bullet wound scars on his back and his relationship with Stockburn, who claims he once knew a man like the Preacher. Viewers are left to draw their own conclusions regarding the overall story line and its meaning.

The movie's title is taken from the Book of Revelation, chapter 6, verse 8: "And I looked, and behold a pale horse: and his name that sat on him was Death, and Hell followed with him." The reading of the biblical passage describing this character is neatly choreographed to correspond with the sudden appearance of the Preacher, who arrived as a result of a prayer from Megan, in which she quoted Psalm 23. Preacher's comment after beating one of the villains is, "Well, the Lord certainly does work in mysterious ways." After Coy offers to let him establish a lucrative ministry in his town, the Preacher replies, "You can't serve God and Mammon both, Mammon being money." According to Robert Jewett, the film's dialogue parallels Paul the Apostle's teaching on divine retribution (Romans 12:19–21).

Reception

Box office 
Pale Rider was released in the United States in June 1985 and became one of the highest-grossing Westerns of the 1980s, grossing $41,410,568 against a $6,900,000 budget. It was the first mainstream Hollywood Western to be produced after the massive financial failure of Heaven's Gate (1980).

Critical response
On Rotten Tomatoes the film has an approval rating of 93% based on reviews from 29 critics. On Metacritic the film has a score of 61% based on reviews from 13 critics, indicating "generally favorable reviews".

The review in The New York Times praised Clint Eastwood's performance: "This veteran movie icon handles both jobs [lead actor and director] with such intelligence and facility I'm just now beginning to realize that, though Mr. Eastwood may have been improving over the years, it's also taken all these years for most of us to recognize his very consistent grace and wit as a film maker," concluding that "it's so evocative of a fabled time and place that it never allows the movie to self-destruct in parody. Pale Rider is the first decent western in a very long time."

The reviewer in The Washington Post dissented, finding that "pretty soon we recollect why westerns lost their appeal. . .[the] movie is real pretty, full of little gold aspens and snow-capped mountains, but it is slow, dark and badly timed." On the other hand, the Chicago Tribune commented that, though Westerns were out of fashion, "fresh and challenging westerns with Clint Eastwood always will be in vogue."

Roger Ebert also praised the film, giving it four out of four stars. Further, he stated, "Pale Rider is, overall, a considerable achievement, a classic Western of style and excitement."

Richard Corliss found the film overly derivative, saying "When Eastwood, who also directed the picture (from a Michael Butler-Dennis Shryack script), faces off against Russell's Maleficent Seven, viewers may get an old-fashioned western tingle. But Pale Rider does nothing to disprove the wisdom that this genre is best left to the revival houses. A double feature of Shane and Eastwood's High Plains Drifter will do just fine, thanks."

The film was entered into the 1985 Cannes Film Festival and included in the Western nominations for the American Film Institute's 10 Top 10 lists.

Trailer music
The music used in the film's trailer was a stock piece by British composer Alan Hawkshaw known to British viewers for its use as the title theme for Channel 4 News. Unusually, Channel 4 News did not secure permanent exclusivity rights to Hawkshaw's theme, titled "Best Endeavours", resulting in it also being used for the trailer for Pale Rider.

References

Further reading

External links
 
 
 

1985 films
1985 Western (genre) films
American Western (genre) fantasy films
Films about mining
Films directed by Clint Eastwood
Films produced by Clint Eastwood
Malpaso Productions films
Warner Bros. films
Films shot in Idaho
Films set in California
Films set in the 1880s
Films scored by Lennie Niehaus
Revisionist Western (genre) films
1980s English-language films
1980s American films